There are about 570 species of Maxillaria. Many species that were formerly classified in this genus have been reclassified under Lycaste and Xylobium. Others have been placed in Brasiliorchis.

Maxillaria acervata Rchb.f.
Maxillaria aciantha Rchb.f.
Maxillaria acicularis Herb ex Lindl.
Maxillaria acostae Schltr.
Maxillaria acuminata, Gradually tapering point maxillaria Lindl. in G.Bentham
Maxillaria acutifolia, Pointy leaf maxillaria Lindl.
Maxillaria acutipetala, Pointy petal maxillaria Hook
Maxillaria adendrobium (Rchb.f.) Dressler
Maxillaria adolphi (Schltr.) Ames & Correll
Maxillaria adscendens Schltr.
Maxillaria aequiloba Schltr.
Maxillaria affinis (Poepp& Endl.) Garay
Maxillaria aggregata (Kunth) Lindl.
Maxillaria alba (Hook.) Lindl.
Maxillaria albata Lindl.
Maxillaria albiflora Ames & C.Schweinf
Maxillaria allenii L.O.Williams
Maxillaria alpestris, Alpine maxillaria Lindlin G.Bentham
Maxillaria alticola C.Schweinf.
Maxillaria amabilis J.T.Atwood
Maxillaria amazonica Schltr.
Maxillaria amblyantha Kraenzl
Maxillaria ampliflora C.Schweinf.
Maxillaria anacatalinaportillae
Maxillaria anatomorum Rchb.f.
Maxillaria anceps Ames & C.Schweinf.
Maxillaria angustibulbosa C.Schweinf.
Maxillaria angustifolia Schltr. - now a synonym of Maxillaria strictifolia P.Ortiz (nom. nov.)
Maxillaria angustisegmenta Ames & C.Schweinf.
Maxillaria angustissima Ames F.T.Hubb & C.Schweinf.
Maxillaria antioquiana Kraenzl
Maxillaria appendiculoides C.Schweinf.
Maxillaria arachnites, Spider-shaped maxillaria Rchb.f.
Maxillaria arachnitiflora, Spider flower maxillaria Ames & C.Schweinf.
Maxillaria arbuscula, Diminutive maxillaria (Lindl.) Rchb.f.
Maxillaria argyrophylla Poepp& Endl
Maxillaria attenuata Ames & C.Schweinf.
Maxillaria atwoodiana Pupulin
Maxillaria augustae-victoriae, Augusta Victoria's maxillaria, Hirtz's maxillaria F.Lehm& Kraenzl.
Maxillaria aurea, Giant maxillaria (Poepp & Endl.) L.O.Williams
Maxillaria aureoglobula Christenson
Maxillaria aurorae D.E.Benn& Christenson
Maxillaria auyantepuiensis Auyantepu maxillaria Foldats
Maxillaria auyantepuiensis subsp. auyantepuiensis
Maxillaria auyantepuiensis subsp. epiphytica Carnevali & I.Ramírez
Maxillaria azulensis D.E.Benn & Christenson.
Maxillaria batemanii Poepp & Endl
Maxillaria bennettii Christenson
Maxillaria bicallosa (Rchb.f.) Garay
Maxillaria bicolor, Joined Pavement (Peru) Ruiz & Pav.
Maxillaria binotii De Wild.
Maxillaria biolleyi (Schltr.) L.O.Williams
Maxillaria bocazensis D.E.Benn& Christenson.
Maxillaria bolivarensis C.Schweinf.
Maxillaria boliviensis Schltr.
Maxillaria bolleoides Schltr.
Maxillaria bomboizensis Dodson
Maxillaria brachybulbon Schltr.
Maxillaria brachypetala Schltr.
Maxillaria brachypoda Schltr.
Maxillaria bracteata (Schltr.) Ames & Correlli
Maxillaria bradei, Brade's maxillaria Schltrex Hoehne
Maxillaria bradeorum (Schltr.) L.O.Williams
Maxillaria brasiliensis, Brazilian maxillaria Brieger & R.D.Illg
Maxillaria brevifolia (Lindl.) Rchb.f. in W.G.Walpers
Maxillaria brevilabia Ames & Correll
Maxillaria brevis (Hoehne & Schltr.) Hoehne
Maxillaria breviscapa Poepp & Endl. : Short-stemmed Maxillaria
Maxillaria broadwayi (Cogn.) R.E.Schult.
Maxillaria burgeri J.T.Atwood
Maxillaria burtonii D.E.Benn & Christenson
Maxillaria cacaoensis J.T.Atwood : Cacao Maxillaria
Maxillaria cachacoensis J.T.Atwood
Maxillaria caespitifica Rchb.f. : Mat-forming Maxillaria
Maxillaria caespitosa C.Schweinf.
Maxillaria calantha Schltr. : Beautiful-blooming Maxillaria
Maxillaria caloglossa Rchb.f.
Maxillaria camaridii Rchb.f. : Camaridium Maxillaria
Maxillaria camaridioides Schltr.
Maxillaria campanulata C.Schweinf.
Maxillaria canarensis J.T.Atwood
Maxillaria candida G.Lodd. ex Lindl.
Maxillaria caparaoensis Brade 
Maxillaria caquetana Schltr.
Maxillaria carinulata Rchb.f.
Maxillaria carolii Christenson
Maxillaria cassapensis Rchb.f. in W.G.Walpers 
Maxillaria casta Kraenzl
Maxillaria caucae Garay
Maxillaria caucana Schltr.
Maxillaria caulina Schltr.
Maxillaria caveroi D.E.Benn & Christenson
Maxillaria cedralensis J.T.Atwood & Mora-Ret.
Maxillaria chacoensis Dodson 
Maxillaria chartacifolia Ames & C.Schweinf.
Maxillaria chicana Dodson
Maxillaria chionantha J.T.Atwood
Maxillaria chlorantha Lindl.
Maxillaria christensonii D.E.Benn.
Maxillaria christobalensis Rchb.f.
Maxillaria chrysocycnoides (Schltr.) Senghas 
Maxillaria cleistogama Brieger & R.D.Illg
Maxillaria cobanensis Schltr. : Coban Maxillaria
Maxillaria coccinea (Jacq.) L.O.Williams ex Hodge : Scarlet Maxillaria
Maxillaria cogniauxiana Hoehne :  Cogniaux' Maxillaria 
Maxillaria colemanii Carnevali & Fritz
Maxillaria colorata Rchb.fin W.G.Walpers 
Maxillaria compacta (Schltr.) P.Ortiz
Maxillaria concavilabia Ames & Correll
Maxillaria condorensis J.T.Atwood
Maxillaria conduplicata (Ames & C.Schweinf.) L.O. Williams
Maxillaria confusa Ames & C.Schweinf. : Confounded Maxillaria
Maxillaria connellii Rolfe 
Maxillaria convencionis Kraenzl
Maxillaria cordyline (Rchb.f.) Dodson
Maxillaria cornuta C.Schweinf.
Maxillaria costaricensis Schltr.
Maxillaria cozierana H.G.Jones 
Maxillaria crassifolia (Lindl.) Rchb.f. : Thick-leaved Maxillaria
Maxillaria crocea Poepp & Endl
Maxillaria croceorubens (Rchb.f.) L.O. Williams 
Maxillaria cryptobulbon Carnevali & J.T. Atwood : Hidden Pseudobulb Maxillaria
Maxillaria ctenostachys Rchb.f.
Maxillaria cucullata Lindl. : Cowl-carrying Maxillaria
Maxillaria cuencana Garay
Maxillaria cuneiformis Ruiz & Pav.
Maxillaria cuzcoensis C.Schweinf.
Maxillaria cymbidioides Dodson J.T. Atwood & Carnevali
Maxillaria cyperifolia (Schltr.) P.Ortiz
Maxillaria dalessandroi Dodson
Maxillaria darienensis J.T.Atwood
Maxillaria dendrobioides (Schltr.) L.O. Williams : Dendrobium-like Maxillaria
Maxillaria densa Lindl. : Crowded Maxillaria
Maxillaria densifolia (Poepp & Endl.) Rchb.f.
Maxillaria desvauxiana Rchb.f. :  Desvaux' Maxillaria
Maxillaria deuterocaquetana P.Ortiz
Maxillaria deuteropastensis P.Ortiz
Maxillaria diamantensis Kraenzl
Maxillaria dichotoma (Schltr.) L.O. Williams
Maxillaria dichroma Rolfe
Maxillaria dillonii D.E. Benn & Christenson : Dillon's Maxillaria
Maxillaria discolor (Lodd. ex Lindl.) Rchb. 
Maxillaria disticha (Lindl.) C.Schweinf.
Maxillaria diuturna Ames & C.Schweinf.
Maxillaria divitiflora Rchb.f.
Maxillaria dolichophylla Schltr.
Maxillaria dressleriana Carnevali & J.T. Atwood
Maxillaria × dunstervillei Carnevali & I. Ramírez
Maxillaria echinophyta Barb.Rodr.
Maxillaria ecuadorensis Schltr. : Ecuadorian Maxillaria
Maxillaria edwardsii D.E.Benn & Christenson
Maxillaria elata Schltr.
Maxillaria elatior (Rchb.f.) Rchb.f. in W.G.Walpers : Albert's Maxillaria, Sturdy Maxillaria
Maxillaria elegans Schltr.
Maxillaria elegantula Rolfe : Graceful Maxillaria
Maxillaria embreei Dodson :  Embre's Maxillaria
Maxillaria encyclioides J.T. Atwood & Dodson
Maxillaria endresii Rchb.f.
Maxillaria equitans (Schltr.) Garay :  Leaf-riding Maxilllaria
Maxillaria erubescens Kraenzl
Maxillaria estradae Dodson 
Maxillaria exaltata (Kraenzl.) C. Schweinf.
Maxillaria falcata Ames & Correll
Maxillaria farinifera Schltr.
Maxillaria ferdinandiana Barb. Rodr.
Maxillaria fimbriatiloba Carnevali & G.A.Romero in G.A.Romero & G.Carnevali 
Maxillaria flava Ames F.T.Hubb & C.Schweinf. : Yellow Maxillaria
Maxillaria fletcheriana Rolfe :  Fletcher's Maxillaria
Maxillaria floribunda Lindl. in G. Bentham
Maxillaria foldatsiana Carnevali & I.Ramírez
Maxillaria formosa Carnevali & G.A.Romero in G.A.Romero & G.Carnevali 
Maxillaria fractiflexa Rchb.f. : Inward-rolling Maxillaria
Maxillaria fragrans J.T.Atwood
Maxillaria frechettei D.E.Benn & Christenson
Maxillaria friderici-caroli P.Ortiz
Maxillaria friedrichsthalii Rchb.f. :  Freidrichsthal's Maxillaria
Maxillaria fucata Rchb.f. : Decorated Maxillaria
Maxillaria fuerstenbergiana Schltr. :  Fuerstenberg's Maxillaria 
Maxillaria fulgens (Rchb.f.) L.O.Williams : Shiny Maxillaria
Maxillaria funerea Lindl.
Maxillaria funicaulis C.Schweinf.
Maxillaria furfuracea Scheidw.
Maxillaria fuscopurpurea Drapiez 
Maxillaria galantha J.T.Atwood & Carnevali
Maxillaria garayi D.E.Benn & Christenson
Maxillaria gatunensis Schltr.
Maxillaria geckophora D.E.Benn & Christenson
Maxillaria gentryi Dodson 
Maxillaria gomeziana J.T.Atwood
Maxillaria gorbatschowii R.Vásquez Dodson & Ibisch 
Maxillaria gracilipes Schltr.
Maxillaria graminifolia (Kunth) Rchb.f. in W.G.Walpers : Grass-like Leafed Maxillaria
Maxillaria grandiflora (Kunth) Lindl. : Large-flowered Maxillaria
Maxillaria grandimentum C.Schweinf. : Large Chin Maxillaria
Maxillaria grandis Rchb.f.
Maxillaria granditenuis D.E.Benn & Christenson
Maxillaria grayi Dodson
Maxillaria grisebachiana Nir & Dod in M.A.Niir
Maxillaria grobyoides Garay & Dunst.
Maxillaria guadalupensis Cogn in I.Urban 
Maxillaria gualaquizensis Dodson
Maxillaria guareimensis Rchb.f. : Guareime Maxillaria
Maxillaria guentheriana Kraenzl
Maxillaria guiardiana Chiron 
Maxillaria gymnochila Kraenzl
Maxillaria haberi J.T.Atwood
Maxillaria haemathodes (Ruiz & Pav.) Garay 
Maxillaria hagsateriana Soto Arenas
Maxillaria hastulata Lindl. in G.Bentham
Maxillaria hedwigiae Hamer & Dodson :  Hedwig's Maxillaria
Maxillaria hennisiana Schltr. :  Hennis' Maxillaria 
Maxillaria herzogiana Kraenzl
Maxillaria hillsii Dodson
Maxillaria hirsutilabia D.E.Benn & Christenson
Maxillaria hirtilabia Lindl.
Maxillaria hoppii Schltr.
Maxillaria horichii Senghas
Maxillaria houtteana Rchb.f. : Short-column Maxillaria,  Houtte's Maxillaria
Maxillaria huancabambae (Kraenzl.) C. Schweinf.
Maxillaria huanucoensis D.E.Benn & Christenson.
Maxillaria huebschii Rchb.f. :  Huebsch' Maxillaria
Maxillaria hystrionica (Rchb.f.) L.O. Williams
Maxillaria imbricata Barb. Rodr.
Maxillaria inaudita Rchb.f. : Unheard Maxillaria
Maxillaria infausta Rchb.f.
Maxillaria inflexa (Lindl.) Griseb.
Maxillaria insignis Rolfe 
Maxillaria insolita Dressler
Maxillaria irrorata Rchb.f.
Maxillaria jamboensis Dodson
Maxillaria jamesonii (Rchb.f.) Garay & C. Schweinf.
Maxillaria jenischiana (Rchb.f.) C. Schweinf.
Maxillaria johannis Pabst
Maxillaria johniana Kraenzl.
Maxillaria jostii Dodson
Maxillaria jucunda F.Lehm & Kraenzl
Maxillaria juergensii Schltr. :  Jurgen's Maxillaria
Maxillaria jugata Garay
Maxillaria kalbreyeri Rchb.f.
Maxillaria kegelii Rchb.f.
Maxillaria klugii C.Schweinf.
Maxillaria koehleri Schltr. : Shiny Lip Maxillaria
Maxillaria laevilabris Lindl. in G. Bentham : Shiny-lip Maxillaria
Maxillaria lamprochlamys (Schltr.) P. Ortiz
Maxillaria langlassei Schltr.
Maxillaria lankesteri Ames : Lankester's Maxillaria
Maxillaria lasallei Foldats 
Maxillaria lawrenceana (Rolfe) Garay & Dunst.
Maxillaria leforii D.E.Benn & Christenson 
Maxillaria lehmannii Rchb.f. : Lehmann's Maxillaria 
Maxillaria lepidota Lindl. : Scaled Maxillaria
Maxillaria leucaimata Barb.Rodr. : White Blood-red Maxillaria
Maxillaria lexarzana Soto Arenas & F.Chiang
Maxillaria lilacea Barb.Rodr.
Maxillaria lilliputana D.E.Benn & Christenson
Maxillaria lindeniae Cogn. : Linden's Maxillaria 
Maxillaria lindleyana Schltr. : Lindley's Maxillaria
Maxillaria linearifolia Ames & C.Schweinf. :  Long-leafed Maxillaria
Maxillaria linearis C.Schweinf.
Maxillaria liparophylla Summerh.
Maxillaria litensis Dodson
Maxillaria loefgrenii (Cogn.) Pabst
Maxillaria longibracteata (Lindl.) Rchb.f. in W.G. Walpers 
Maxillaria longicaulis Schltr
Maxillaria longicolumna J.T.Atwood
Maxillaria longiloba (Ames & C.Schweinf.) J.T.Atwood
Maxillaria longipes Lindl. in G. Bentham : Long Column Foot Maxillaria
Maxillaria longipetiolata Ames & C. Schweinf.
Maxillaria longissima Lindl. : Longest Petal Maxillaria
Maxillaria loretoensis C.Schweinf.
Maxillaria lueri Dodson
Maxillaria luteoalba Lindl. : Yellow and White Maxillaria
Maxillaria luteobrunnea (Kraenzl.) P.Ortiz
Maxillaria lutheri J.T.Atwood
Maxillaria machinazensis D.E.Benn & Christenson
Maxillaria machupicchuensis Christenson & N.Salinas
Maxillaria macleei Bateman ex Lindl
Maxillaria macropoda Schltr.
Maxillaria macrura Rchb.f. : Long-tailed Maxillaria
Maxillaria macrura f. aurea Christenson (Venezuela)
Maxillaria maderoi Schltr.
Maxillaria madida Lindl. : Moist-growing Maxillaria
Maxillaria maldonadoensis J.T.Atwood
Maxillaria maleolens Schltr.
Maxillaria mapiriensis (Kraenzl.) L.O. Williams 
Maxillaria margretiae R.Vásquez 
Maxillaria mariaisabeliae J.T.Atwood
Maxillaria marmoliana Dodson 
Maxillaria matthewsii Lindl. in G.Bentham :  Matthews' Maxillaria
Maxillaria mejiae Carnevali & G.A.Romero in G.A.Romero & G.Carnevali
Maxillaria meleagris Lindl. : Spotted Guinea Fowl Maxillaria, Dotted and Striped Maxillaria
Maxillaria melina Lindl.
Maxillaria merana Dodson
Maxillaria meridensis Lindl. : Mérida Maxillaria
Maxillaria mexicana J.T.Atwood:.
Maxillaria microblephara Schltr.
Maxillaria microdendron Schltr.
Maxillaria microiridifolia D.E.Benn& Christenson
Maxillaria microphyton Schltr.
Maxillaria microtricha Schltr.
Maxillaria milenae V.P.Castro & Chiron
Maxillaria miniata (Lindl.) L.O. Williams : Rust-red Maxillaria
Maxillaria minor (Schltr.) L.O. Williams : Least Maxillaria
Maxillaria minuta Cognin C.F.P.von Martius & auct. suc. (eds.)
Maxillaria minutiflora D.E.Benn & Christenson
Maxillaria modesta Schltr.
Maxillaria modestiflora Pabst
Maxillaria molitor Rchb.f.
Maxillaria mombachoensis A.Heller ex J.T.Atwood
Maxillaria monacensis Kraenzl.
Maxillaria monteverdensis J.T.Atwood & Barboza
Maxillaria montezumae Molinari Novoa
Maxillaria moralesii Carnevali & J.T.Atwood
Maxillaria mosenii Kraenzl. :  Mosen's Maxillaria 
Maxillaria muelleri Regel
Maxillaria multicaulis (Poepp & Endl.) C.Schweinf.
Maxillaria multiflora Barb.Rodr.
Maxillaria mungoschraderi R.Vásquez & Ibisch
Maxillaria muscicola Rchb.f.
Maxillaria muscoides J.T.Atwood
Maxillaria nagelii L.O.Williams ex Correl
Maxillaria nanegalensis Rchb.f.
Maxillaria napoensis Dodson 
Maxillaria nardoides Kraenzl. : Pine Needle Maxillaria
Maxillaria nasuta Rchb.f. : Nosed Maxillaria
Maxillaria neglecta (Schltr.) L.O. Williams
Maxillaria neillii Dodson
Maxillaria neophylla Rchb.f.
Maxillaria neowiedii Rchb.f.
Maxillaria nicaraguensis (Hamer & Garay) J.T. Atwood
Maxillaria niesseniae Christenson
Maxillaria nigrescens Lindl. : Blackish Maxillaria
Maxillaria nitidula Rchb.f.
Maxillaria notylioglossa Rchb.f. : Notylia-like Lip Maxillaria
Maxillaria nubigena (Rchb.f.) C.Schweinf. : Cloud-growing Maxillaria
Maxillaria nuriensis Carnevali & I.Ramírez
Maxillaria nutans Lindlin G.Bentham :  Nodding Maxillaria
Maxillaria nutantiflora Schltr.
Maxillaria nymphopolitana Kraenzl
Maxillaria obscura Linden & Rchb.f.
Maxillaria ochracea (Rchb.f.) Garay 
Maxillaria ochroglossa Schltr.
Maxillaria ochroleuca Lodd. ex Lindl.
Maxillaria oestlundiana L.O.Williams
Maxillaria olivacea (Kraenzl.) P.Ortiz
Maxillaria ophiodens J.T.Atwood
Maxillaria oreocharis Schltr.
Maxillaria oxapampensis J.T.Atwood
Maxillaria oxysepala Schltr.
Maxillaria pacholskii Christenson
Maxillaria pachyacron Schltr.
Maxillaria pachyneura F.Lehm & Kraenzl.
Maxillaria pachyphylla Schltrex Hoehne
Maxillaria paleata (Rchb.f.) Ames & Correll
Maxillaria palmensis Dodson
Maxillaria palmifolia (Sw.) Lindl.
Maxillaria pamplonensis Linden & Rchb.f.
Maxillaria pannieri Foldats 
Maxillaria parahybunensis Cognin C.F.P.von Martius & auct. suc. (eds.) : Parahybuna Maxillaria
Maxillaria paranaensis Barb.Rodr.
Maxillaria pardalina Garay
Maxillaria parkeri Hook.
Maxillaria parvibulbosa C.Schweinf.
Maxillaria parviflora (Poepp. & Endl.) Garay : Small-flowered Maxillaria
Maxillaria parvilabia Rolfe
Maxillaria pastensis Rchb.f.
Maxillaria pastorellii D.E.Benn. & Christenson
Maxillaria patella J.T.Atwood
Maxillaria patens Schltr.
Maxillaria patula C.Schweinf.
Maxillaria pauciflora Barb.Rodr.
Maxillaria paulistana Hoehne
Maxillaria pendens Pabst : Pendant-growing Maxillaria
Maxillaria pendula (Poepp. & Endl.) C.Schweinf.
Maxillaria pentura Lindl.
Maxillaria perryae Dodson :  Perry's Maxillaria
Maxillaria peruviana (C.Schweinf.) D.E.Benn. & Christenson
Maxillaria pfitzeri Senghas 
Maxillaria piestopus Schltr.
Maxillaria pittieri (Ames) L.O.Williams
Maxillaria planicola C.Schweinf.
Maxillaria platyloba Schltr.
Maxillaria platypetala Ruiz & Pav.
Maxillaria plebeja Rchb.f. : Insignificant Maxillaria
Maxillaria pleiantha Schltr.
Maxillaria pleuranthoides (Schltr.) Garay
Maxillaria plicata Schltr.
Maxillaria poaefolia Schltr.
Maxillaria podochila Kraenzl.
Maxillaria poicilothece Schltr.
Maxillaria polybulbon Kraenzl.
Maxillaria ponerantha Rchb.f.
Maxillaria porrecta Lindl. : Extended Maxillaria
Maxillaria portillae Christenson & McIllm.
Maxillaria powellii Schltr.
Maxillaria praestans Rchb.f. : Outstanding Maxillaria
Maxillaria praetexta Rchb.f.
Maxillaria proboscidea Rchb.f. : Nose-like Maxillaria
Maxillaria procurrens Lindl.
Maxillaria prolifera Ruiz & Pav.
Maxillaria pseudoneglecta J.T.Atwood
Maxillaria pseudonubigena J.T.Atwood
Maxillaria pseudoreichenheimiana Dodson : False Reichenheim Maxillaria
Maxillaria pterocarpa Barb.Rodr.
Maxillaria pudica Carnevali & J.L.Tapia
Maxillaria pulchra (Schltr.) L.O.Williams ex Correll : Beautiful Maxillaria
Maxillaria pulla Linden & Rchb.f. : Dark Maxillaria
Maxillaria pumila Hook : Dwarf Maxillaria
Maxillaria purpurata (Lindl.) Rchb.f. in W.G.Walpers 
Maxillaria purpureolabia D.E.Benn& Christenson
Maxillaria pustulosa J.T.Atwood
Maxillaria pyhalae D.E.Benn. & Christenson
Maxillaria quadrata Ames & Correll
Maxillaria quelchii Rolfe
Maxillaria quercicola (Schltr.) P.Ortiz
Maxillaria quitensis (Rchb.f.) C.Schweinf.
Maxillaria ramonensis Schltr.
Maxillaria ramosa Ruiz & Pav. (type species)
Maxillaria ramosissima Kraenzl.
Maxillaria rauhii D.E.Benn. & Christenson (Peru)
Maxillaria regeliana Cognin C.F.P.von Martius & auct. suc. (eds.)
Maxillaria reichenheimiana Endres & Rchb.f :  Reichenheim's Maxillaria
Maxillaria rhodoleuca (Schltr.) P.Ortiz
Maxillaria rhombea Lindl.
Maxillaria richii Dodson :  Rich's Maxillaria
Maxillaria rigida Barb.Rodr.
Maxillaria ringens Rchb.f. in W.G.Walpers : Rigid Maxillaria
Maxillaria riopalenquensis Dodson
Maxillaria robusta Barb.Rodr.
Maxillaria rodriguesii Cognin C.F.P.von Martius & auct. suc. (eds.) :  Rodrigues' Maxillaria
Maxillaria rodrigueziana J.T.Atwood & Mora-Ret :  Rodriguez' Maxillaria
Maxillaria rolfei P.Ortiz
Maxillaria rotundilabia C.Schweinf.
Maxillaria ruberrima (Lindl.) Garay
Maxillaria rubioi Dodson :  Rubio's Maxillaria
Maxillaria rufescens Lindl. : Light Fox-red Maxillaria
Maxillaria rupestris Barb.Rodr. : Rock-loving Maxillaria
Maxillaria rupestris Barb.Rodr. f. brevis (Hoehne & Schltr.) F.Barros (formerly Maxillaria picta var. brevis)
Maxillaria sanaensis D.E.Benn. & Christenson
Maxillaria sanantonioensis Christenson
Maxillaria sanderiana Rchb.f. ex Sander :  Sander's Maxillaria
Maxillaria sanguinea Rolfe (may have become naturalized in the USA, but this remains doubtful) : Blood-red Maxillaria
Maxillaria sanguineomaculata Schltr.
Maxillaria santanae Carnevali & I.Ramírez
Maxillaria saragurensis Dodson
Maxillaria saxatilis Rchb.f.
Maxillaria saxicola Schltr.
Maxillaria scalariformis J.T.Atwood : Ladder-like Maxillaria
Maxillaria scandens D.E.Benn. & Christenson
Maxillaria schistostele Schltr.
Maxillaria schlechteri Foldats
Maxillaria schlechteriana (C.Schweinf.) J.T.Atwood
Maxillaria schnitteri Schltr.
Maxillaria schultzei Schltr.
Maxillaria scorpioidea Kraenzl. : Scorpion Flower Maxillaria
Maxillaria sculliana J.T.Atwood
Maxillaria seidelii Pabst :  Seidel's Maxillaria
Maxillaria semiscabra (Lindl.) P.Ortiz
Maxillaria serrulata Ames & Correll
Maxillaria setigera Lindl. : Bristle-carrying Maxillaria
Maxillaria shepheardii Rolfe :  Shepheard's Maxillaria
Maxillaria sigmoidea (C.Schweinf.) Ames & Correll
Maxillaria simacoana Schltr.
Maxillaria simplex J.T.Atwood
Maxillaria simplicilabia C.Schweinf.
Maxillaria soconuscana Breedlove & D.Mally
Maxillaria sodiroi (Schltr.) Senghas 
Maxillaria sophronitis (Rchb.f.) Garay : Sophronitis-like Maxillaria
Maxillaria sotoana Carnevali & Gómez-Juárez
Maxillaria spannagelii Hoehne
Maxillaria spathulata C.Schweinf.
Maxillaria speciosa Rchb.f.
Maxillaria spegazziniana Kraenzl.
Maxillaria spilotantha Rchb.f.
Maxillaria spiritu-sanctensis Pabst : Espiritu Santa Maxillaria
Maxillaria splendens Poepp. & Endl : Grand Maxillaria, Buchtien's Maxillaria
Maxillaria squarrosa (Schltr.) Dodson
Maxillaria stenophylla Rchb.f.
Maxillaria sterrocaulos (Schltr.) P.Ortiz
Maxillaria steyermarkii Foldats
Maxillaria stictantha Schltr.
Maxillaria striata Rolfe : Striped Maxillaria
Maxillaria stricta Schltr.
Maxillaria strictifolia P.Ortiz. (nom. nov.) (formerly Maxillaria angustifolia Schltr.)
Maxillaria strictissima (Kraenzl.) P.Ortiz
Maxillaria strumata (Endres & Rchb.f.) Ames & Correll
Maxillaria suareziorum Dodson
Maxillaria suaveolens Barringer
Maxillaria subpandurata Schltr.
Maxillaria subulata Lindl.
Maxillaria subulifolia Schltr.
Maxillaria sulfurea Schltr.
Maxillaria superflua Rchb.f. : Different-colored Maxillaria
Maxillaria swartziana C.D.Adams
Maxillaria synsepala J.T.Atwood
Maxillaria taracuana Schltr.
Maxillaria tenuibulba Christenson
Maxillaria tenuifolia Lindl. : Delicate-leafed Maxillaria, Coconut Pie Orchid
Maxillaria tenuis C.Schweinf.
Maxillaria thurstoniorum Dodson
Maxillaria tiaraensis Carnevali & G.A.Romero in G.A.Romero & G.Carnevali
Maxillaria tocotana Schltr.
Maxillaria tonduzii (Schltr.) Ames & Correll
Maxillaria tonsbergii Christenson
Maxillaria tonsoniae Soto Arenas
Maxillaria torifera (Schltr.) P.Ortiz
Maxillaria tricarinata J.T.Atwood
Maxillaria tricolor Ruiz & Pav.
Maxillaria trigona C.Schweinf.
Maxillaria trigona subsp. amaroensis D.E.Benn& Christenson
Maxillaria trigona subsp. trigona
Maxillaria trilobata Ames & Correll
Maxillaria trilobulata D.E.Benn. & Christenson
Maxillaria triloris E.Morren : Three-straped Maxillaria
Maxillaria triphylla Ruiz & Pav.
Maxillaria tristis Schltr.
Maxillaria truncatilabia Schltr.
Maxillaria tubercularis J.T.Atwood
Maxillaria tuerosii D.E.Benn& Christenson
Maxillaria turkeliae Christenson  :  Tuerkel's Maxillaria
Maxillaria tutae J.T.Atwood
Maxillaria umbratilis L.O.Williams
Maxillaria uncata Lindl. : Hook-shaped Maxillaria
Maxillaria undatiflora Ruiz & Pav.
Maxillaria unguiculata Schltr.
Maxillaria unguilabia Schltr.
Maxillaria unicarinata C.Schweinf.
Maxillaria urbaniana F.Lehm & Kraenzl.
Maxillaria vaginalis Rchb.f.
Maxillaria valenzuelana (A.Rich.) Nash :  Valenzuela's Maxillaria
Maxillaria valenzuelana subsp. angustata J.T.Atwood
Maxillaria valenzuelana subsp. valenzuelana
Maxillaria valerioi Ames & C.Schweinf.
Maxillaria valleculata D.E.Benn & Christenson
Maxillaria variabilis Bateman ex Lindl. : Variable Maxillaria
Maxillaria venusta Linden & Rchb.f. : Charming Maxillaria
Maxillaria verecunda Schltr.
Maxillaria vernicosa Barb.Rodr. : Varnished Maxillaria
Maxillaria villonacensis Dodson
Maxillaria villosa (Barb.Rodr.) Cognin C.F.P.von Martius & auct. suc. (eds.) : Shaggy Maxillaria
Maxillaria vinosa Senghas
Maxillaria violaceopunctata Rchb.f. : Violet-spotted Maxillaria
Maxillaria virguncula Rchb.f
Maxillaria vitelliniflora Barb.Rodr. : Yolk-yellow Flower Maxillaria
Maxillaria vittariifolia L.O.Williams
Maxillaria vulcanica, Volcano maxillaria F.Lehm & Kraenzl.
Maxillaria wercklei (Schltr.) L.O.Williams : Werckle's Maxillaria
Maxillaria whittenii Dodson
Maxillaria williamsii Dodson
Maxillaria winaywaynaensis D.E.Benn. & Christenson
Maxillaria witsenioides Schltr.
Maxillaria wojii Christenson
Maxillaria woytkowskii C.Schweinf.
Maxillaria xantholeuca Schltr.
Maxillaria xanthorhoda Schltr.
Maxillaria xylobiiflora Schltr.
Maxillaria yanganensis Dodson
Maxillaria yauaperyensis Barb.Rodr.
Maxillaria × yucatanensis Carnevali & R.Jiménez

Maxillaria
 List